WIEC-LP (102.7 FM) is a radio station licensed to Eau Claire, Wisconsin, United States.  The station is currently owned by The Eau Claire Broadcasting Association.

References

External links
WIEC-LP website
 

IEC-LP
IEC-LP
Radio stations established in 2006
2006 establishments in Wisconsin